Mawyawadi Football Club is a Burmese football club, founded in 2012.

Current squad

References

External links
 First Eleven Journal in Burmese
 Soccer Myanmar in Burmese

Football clubs in Myanmar
Association football clubs established in 2012
Myanmar National League clubs
2012 establishments in Myanmar